Kilbeggan was a constituency represented in the Irish House of Commons from 1612 to 1800.

History
The borough was incorporated by James I by a Charter dated 27 February 1612. The charter conferred upon the elected portreeve and burgesses the right to return two Members to Parliament. In the Patriot Parliament of 1689 summoned by James II, Kilbeggan was represented by two members. Between 1725 and 1793 Catholics and those married to Catholics could not vote.

A sum of £15,000 was paid at the 1801 Union, to Gustavus Lambart as compensation for the loss of the elective franchise.

Members of Parliament, 1612–1801
1613–1615 Sir Robert Newcomen and Beverly Newcomen
1634–1635 Edward Keating and Robert Birley
1639–1649 Sir Robert Forth and John Warren (Warren died and was replaced in 1647 by Richard Lambart. 
1661–1666 Walter Lambert (died and replaced 1665 by Francis Willoughby) and Oliver Lambert of Painstown

1689–1801

Notes

References

Bibliography

Constituencies of the Parliament of Ireland (pre-1801)
Historic constituencies in County Westmeath
1612 establishments in Ireland
1800 disestablishments in Ireland
Constituencies established in 1612
Constituencies disestablished in 1800